Rhe-Ann Niles-Mapp also simply known as Rhe-Ann Niles (born 14 June 1986) is a Barbadian netball player who represents Barbados internationally and plays in the positions of goal keeper and goal defense. She competed at the Netball World Cup on three occasions in 2003, 2015 and 2019. She also represented Barbados at the Commonwealth Games in 2014 and in 2018.

References 

1986 births
Living people
Barbadian netball players
Netball players at the 2014 Commonwealth Games
Netball players at the 2018 Commonwealth Games
Commonwealth Games competitors for Barbados
2019 Netball World Cup players